South Side Soul is the debut album by jazz pianist John Wright which was recorded in 1960 and released on the Prestige label.

Reception

Scott Yanow, reviewing this record for AllMusic, states: "John Wright, who is now quite obscure, recorded five albums during 1960-62 that emphasized the soulful side of hard bop. [...] Wright performs seven of his originals, all of which have something to do with Chicago. [...] Wright plays soulfully while swinging."

Track listing 
 "South Side Soul" (Esmond Edwards) – 5:02
 "47th and Calumet" (John Wright) – 3:57
 "La Salle St After Hours" (Armond Jackson) – 5:21
 "63rd and Cottage Grove" (Wright) – 4:06
 "35th St Blues" (Wendell Roberts) – 7:00
 "Sin Corner" (Jackson) – 5:30
 "Amen Corner" (Roberts) – 5:30

Personnel

Performance
John Wright - piano
Wendell Roberts  - bass
Walter McCants - drums

Production
 Esmond Edwards – supervision
 Rudy Van Gelder – engineer

References 

1960 debut albums
John Wright (pianist) albums
Prestige Records albums
Albums recorded at Van Gelder Studio
Albums produced by Esmond Edwards